Prout may refer to:

Surname
 Christopher Prout, Baron Kingsland (1942–2009), British politician
 Ebenezer Prout (1835–1909), English composer, music theorist, writer and teacher
 Elizabeth Prout (1820–1864), Catholic nun and Servant of God 
 Francis Sylvester Mahony (1804–1866), Irish humorist known as Father Prout
 Frank Prout (1921–2011), British canoer
 Gavin Prout (born 1978), Canadian lacrosse player
 George Prout (1878 – c. 1980), Canadian politician
 Jacob W. Prout (1804–1849), Liberian politician and physician
 John Skinner Prout (1805–1876), artist, nephew of Samuel Prout
 John T. Prout (1880–1969), Irish American soldier
 Kirsten Prout (born 1990), Canadian actress
 Louis Beethoven Prout (1864–1943), English entomologist and musicologist, son of Ebenezer Prout
 Richard Prout (born 1967), British entrepreneur, founder of Intracus Ltd
 Roland Prout (1920–1997), British canoer
 Samuel Prout (1783–1852), British watercolourist

 William Prout (1785–1850), English chemist and physicist
 William C. Prout (1886–1927), American athlete

Other uses
 Progressive Utilization Theory (PROUT)
 Prout (unit), a unit of nuclear binding energy
 The Prout School, a high school in Rhode Island, United States
 Prout's hypothesis, a 19th century hypothesis about the structure of the atom
 Prouts Neck, Maine
 Reliques of Father Prout
G. Prout & Sons, British company making catamarans

See also
 Prouty (disambiguation)